Jacques Vernier (born 3 July 1944) is a former French politician (RPR).

From 1983 until 2014 he was mayor of Douai, from 1984 until 1993 Member of the European Parliament and from 1993 until 1997 member of the National Assembly of France representing Nord's 17th constituency.

External links 

 Jacques Vernier's website
 Jacques Vernier at the European Parliament
 Jacques Vernier at the National Assembly of France

1944 births
Living people
Rally for the Republic politicians
Deputies of the 10th National Assembly of the French Fifth Republic
MEPs for France 1984–1989
MEPs for France 1989–1994